Ermentrude or Ermintrude is a feminine Germanic name from the Middle Ages. It may refer to:

Erminethrudis (d. c. 600), a Merovingian-era nun
Ermentrude of Orléans (823–869), queen of the Franks by her marriage to Charles the Bald
Ermentrude, daughter of Louis the Stammerer (b. c. 875/78), wife of Count Eberard of Sulichgau
Ermentrude de Roucy (958–1005), countess consort of Burgundy
Ermentrude of Maine (d. 1126), Countess of Maine and the Lady of Château-du-Loir 
Ermintrude, a character in the television series The Magic Roundabout
Ermintrude, a character in Terry Pratchett's Nation (novel)

See also
 Ermyntrude, similarly spelled name
 Hermuthruda, legendary queen of Scotland
 Michael Ehrmantraut, a fictional character in the shows Breaking Bad and Better Call Saul
"The Defenestration of Ermintrude Inch", a science-fiction short story by Arthur C. Clarke
 Rae Armantrout, an American poet often associated with the Language poets

Feminine given names